After You've Gone may refer to:

Music 
 "After You've Gone" (song), a 1918 song written by Turner Layton and Henry Creamer
 After You've Gone, an album by Lenny Solomon
 After You've Gone, a 2004 album by Barre Phillips, Tetsu Saitoh, William Parker, and Joëlle Léandre

Television and film 
 After You've Gone (TV series), a 2007–2008 British sitcom
 After You've Gone, 1984 UK film starring Adrian Dunbar
 "After You've Gone", an episode of Jake and the Fatman
 "After You've Gone", an episode of True Detective

Literature 
 After You've Gone, a 1989 short-story collection by Alice Adams
 After You've Gone, a 2007 novel by Joan Lingard
 After You've Gone: My Life After Maurie Fields, a 1998 book by Val Jellay